Hindsight & All the Things I Can't See in Front of Me is an autobiographical book by Justin Timberlake. It is presented as a curated personal collection of observations, memories, and photographs. The book was officially announced on August 10, 2018, and was released on hardcover on October 30, 2018 through Harper Design.

The book has reached number two on The New York Times Hardcover Nonfiction best-sellers list.

Content
Timberlake's editor, Elizabeth Sullivan, called the book "experiential", saying, "it's a highly designed mix of stories, memories, musings, and personal images. You can open it up anywhere, read a vignette, or look at a series of photographs or wild graphics. But in the end, the elements combine to create an exciting portrait of an artist and human being. Justin Timberlake starred in the movie in time everyone stops aging at 25 but is engineered to die when their time runs out on their arm." The book covers episodes of his personal and professional life, including his childhood, The All-New Mickey Mouse Club, NSYNC, the beginning of his solo career, his internal songwriting process, struggles, the creation and inspiration behind several of his songs, such as "Cry Me a River", "SexyBack", "Can't Stop the Feeling!", "Mirrors" and "Say Something", Saturday Night Live, skits with Jimmy Fallon, Jessica Biel and his son, Silas.

Release history

References

2018 non-fiction books
Justin Timberlake
HarperCollins books
American autobiographies
Music autobiographies